The Interrogator is a 1961 British TV play set during the Cyprus Emergency (1955-1959). It was written by Troy Kennedy Martin who had served in Cyprus and written another play set there, Incident at Echo Six.

Plot
In Cyprus, a British officer interrogates an EOKA terrorist.

References

External links
The Interrogator at BFI
The Interrogator at BBC
 

Films about terrorism in Europe
Films set in the 1950s
Films set in Cyprus
British television plays
1961 television plays
Cyprus Emergency
Television episodes written by Troy Kennedy Martin